Mountain Home Reservoir is a reservoir and state wildlife area in Costilla County, Colorado, near Fort Garland. Frozen in winter, the reservoir lies at  elevation on the western slope of the Culebra Range of the Sangre de Cristo Mountains in southern Colorado.

The reservoir impounds Trinchera Creek and lies near the Trinchera Ranch and Sangre de Cristo Ranches subdivisions.

The dam was built in 1912-1913. The reservoir is the site of the Mountain Home Reservoir State Wildlife Area, managed by Colorado Parks and Wildlife. Among the species of fish anglers can catch in the reservoir is northern pike.

References

External links
Mountain Home Reservoir State Wildlife Area

Reservoirs in Colorado
Lakes of Costilla County, Colorado
1913 establishments in Colorado
Dams completed in 1913
Wildlife management areas of Colorado